In number theory, a totative of a given positive integer  is an integer  such that  and  is coprime to .  Euler's totient function φ(n) counts the number of totatives of n.  The totatives under multiplication modulo n form the multiplicative group of integers modulo n.

Distribution
The distribution of totatives has been a subject of study.  Paul Erdős conjectured that, writing the totatives of n as

the mean square gap satisfies

for some constant C, and this was proven by Bob Vaughan and Hugh Montgomery.

See also
Reduced residue system

References

Further reading

External links

Modular arithmetic